Yeomjang (염장, 閻長, ?-?), also mentioned as Yeommun, was a Silla general who is best known for assassinating Jang Bogo. Yeom had actually been a subordinate of Jang Bogo, but their relationship apparently deteriorated as he was once punished by Jang Bogo for having been personally engaged in slave trade. 

Eventually, Yeom Jang turned to Kim Yang (김양, 金陽, 808-857), actual power of the Korean court, under whose direction, he went on a quest to kill Jang Bogo.

In popular culture
 Portrayed by Song Il-gook and Hong Hyun-ki in the 2004-2005 KBS2 TV series Emperor of the Sea.
 Portrayed by Bae Do-hwan and Kim Ki-doo in the 2012-2013 KBS1 TV series The King's Dream.

References

See also
Jang Bogo
Silla
History of Korea

Silla people